The Winchester City Mill is a restored water mill situated on the River Itchen in the centre of the ancient English city of Winchester. The mill is owned by the National Trust and is a Grade II* listed building.

History
The mill was recorded, milling corn, in the Domesday Book of 1086.  However, there are earlier references going back to 932 in the cathedral records. In 989 Queen Elfrida had passed the mill to the nuns of Wherwell Abbey. Dendochronological measurements date some of the timbers to the 11th Century.

It was originally known as Eastgate Mill until 1554 when it was given to the city by Queen Mary in recompense for the expense caused by her marriage to Philip I of Spain. The mill was last rebuilt in 1744 by James Cook, a tanner. In 1820 the Corporation sold the mill to John Benham whose family continued to operate the mill and it remained in use until the early 1900s. The mill was used as a laundry during World War I. In 1928 it was offered for sale. In order to prevent its demolition, a group of benefactors bought the mill and presented it to the National Trust. In 1931 the mill was leased to the Youth Hostels Association for use as a hostel, a usage that continued until 2005.

In 2004, a 12-year restoration program came to a successful conclusion, and after a hiatus of at least 90 years the mill again milled flour by water power. The water wheel can be seen working daily throughout the year and flour milling is demonstrated every weekend of the year, and most Wednesdays during the Summer. The mill building also houses a National Trust cafe and shop.

Otter Watch
In partnership with the Hampshire and Isle of Wight Wildlife Trust and the Environment Agency, night-vision cameras have been set up to monitor the river passing under the mill and record images of otters passing through.  Recordings of sightings are played back on a monitor in the stone floor area.

References

National Trust (2006). Winchester City Mill - History. Retrieved 12 February 2006.

External links
National Trust web pages on Winchester City Mill.
.

National Trust properties in Hampshire
Mill museums in England
City Mill
Watermills in Hampshire
Watermills mentioned in the Domesday Book
City Mill
Museums in Winchester
Grade II* listed buildings in Hampshire